Solar boat may refer to:
 solar barge, also known as a "solar bark", "solar barque", "solar boat", or "sun boat", the mythical boat used by the sun gods of various polytheistic religions.
 An electric boat powered by direct solar energy.